The Heinkel He 57 was a single engine amphibious flying boat built in 1929.

Development
The sole He 57 {factory designation HE.57) was built by the Ernst-Heinkel-Flugzeugwerken at Warnemunde in 1929. It was displayed at the Paris Aero Show in December 1930 and at the Stockholm International Aero Show in May 1931. It was purchased by the flying school at List auf Sylt who used it as a trainer.

Design
The double stepped hull was made of aluminum. The wings used wood spars and aluminum ribs with fabric covering. The landing gear was hydraulically raised with a manual pump.

Specifications Heinkel He 57

References

Amphibious aircraft
He 057
Aircraft first flown in 1929